"Tonite" is a song by American rapper and producer DJ Quik, released as the second single from his debut studio album Quik Is the Name. The song contains samples from "Tonight" performed by Kleeer, "Tonight Is the Night" performed by Betty Wright and "Last Night Changed It All (I Really Had a Ball)" performed by Esther Williams. Complex deemed it the 44th best of "The Best L.A. Rap Songs". The synthesizer part was programmed by LA Dream Team's former producer The Real Richie Rich.

Track listings
U.S. CD single
"Tonite" (Album Version) – 5:23
"Tonite" (Instrumental) – 5:13
"Tonite" (Seasoning Salt Remix) – 5:25
"Tonite" (Seasoning Salt Instrumental) – 5:16

U.S. 12" single
"Tonite" (Album Version) – 5:23
"Tonite" (Radio Edit) – 3:29
"Tonite" (Instrumental) – 5:12
"Tonite" (Seasoning Salt Remix) – 5:25
"Tonite" (Seasoning Salt Instrumental) – 5:16

U.S. Cassette single
"Tonite" – 5:23
"Tonite" (Seasoning Salt Remix) – 5:25

U.S. promo CD single
"Tonite" (Radio Edit) – 3:29
"Tonite" (Full-Length Radio Version) – 5:22

UK 12" single
"Tonite" (Album Version) – 5:23
"Tonite" (Radio Edit) – 3:59
"Tonite" (Seasoning Salt Remix) – 5:25
"Tonite" (Seasoning Salt Instrumental) – 4:49

Charts

References 

1991 singles
1991 songs
DJ Quik songs
Song recordings produced by DJ Quik
Songs written by DJ Quik